The khuuchir is a bowed musical instrument of Mongolia. Formerly, the nomads mainly used the snake skin violin or horsetail violin. The Chinese call it "the Mongol instrument" or "huk'in or huqin". It is tuned in the interval of a fifth and is small or middle sized. The khuuchir has a small, cylindrical, square or cup-like resonator made of bamboo, wood or copper, covered with a snake skin and open at the bottom. The neck is inserted in the body of the instrument. It usually has four silk strings, of which the first and the third are accorded in unison, whereas the second and fourth are tuned in the upper fifth. 

The more popular of the hu'kin instruments have only two strings and are called "erhu", which means "two" (of the hu'kin) in Chinese. The bow is coated with horsetail hair and inseparably interlaced with the string-pair. A four-stringed version is called the "si'khuu or sihu", that is "four", also meaning, "having four ears". 
The erhu can be traced back to instruments introduced into China more than a thousand years ago. It is believed to have evolved from the xiqin. The xiqin is believed to have come from ancient nomadic Hu-people, specifically the Xí tribe of who lived at the borders of ancient Chinese kingdoms. The name huqin literally means "instrument of the Hu people", showing that the instrument may have originated from regions to the north, west or northeastern extremities of ancient China, generally inhabited by nomadic people on the extremities of past Chinese kingdoms.

See also
Music of Mongolia
Music of Central Asia

References

External links
ОДНОО /khuuchir/ - MELODY

Mongolian musical instruments